Demain may also refer to:

Tomorrow (2008 film) (a/k/a Demain), a 2008 Canadian drama film directed by Maxime Giroux
Tomorrow (2015 film) (a/k/a Demain), a 2015 French documentary film by Cyril Dion and Mélanie Laurent
Demain (song), 2018 song by Bigflo & Oli in collaboration with Petit Biscuit

People with the surname
Adrian Demain (born 1966), American musician
Arnold Demain (born 1927), American microbiologist
John DeMain (active 1983-), American musician

See also